The Masonic Temple in Youngstown, Ohio is a building from 1909. It was listed on the National Register of Historic Places in 1997.

In January, 2016 it was announced that Wick Lodge No. 481 (the last Masonic Lodge to meet in the building) could no longer afford to maintain it, and the building is to be sold.

References

Clubhouses on the National Register of Historic Places in Ohio
Colonial Revival architecture in Ohio
Masonic buildings completed in 1909
Buildings and structures in Youngstown, Ohio
Masonic buildings in Ohio
National Register of Historic Places in Mahoning County, Ohio
1909 establishments in Ohio